"Tu mi hai capito" is a song by Italian rapper and singer Madame, with featured vocals by Sfera Ebbasta.

The song was released as a single on 3 September 2021 and was included in the digital re-issue of the debut album Madame. A French version featuring Hatik, entitled "Tu m'as compris", was released on 28 January 2022.

Charts

Weekly charts

Year-end charts

Certifications

References

2021 songs
2021 singles
Madame (singer) songs
Sfera Ebbasta songs
Sugar Music singles